The GWF Light Heavyweight Championship was the secondary title in the Global Wrestling Federation in Texas. The title existed from 1991 until 1994, when GWF closed. The title was defended on the promotion's show that aired nationally on ESPN.

Tournaments

1991
The GWF Light Heavyweight Championship Tournament was a twenty-four man tournament for the inaugural GWF Light Heavyweight Championship held on July 12 and July 13, 1991. The Lightning Kid defeated Jerry Lynn in the final to win the tournament.

1992
The GWF Light Heavyweight Championship Tournament was a three-man tournament for the vacated GWF Light Heavyweight Championship held on May 29, 1992. The title was vacated after previous champion Danny Davis left the company for United States Wrestling Association. Terry Simms defeated Chaz in the final to win the tournament.

Title history

Combined reigns

Footnotes

See also
Global Wrestling Federation

References
G.W.F. Light Heavyweight Title - Wrestling-Titles.com

References

Global Wrestling Federation championships
Light heavyweight wrestling championships